Pseudicius gracilis is a small jumping spider that lives in South Africa. The species, a member of the genus Pseudicius, was first described in 2011. It is related to Pseudicius elegans.

References

Endemic fauna of South Africa
Salticidae
Spiders described in 2011
Spiders of South Africa
Taxa named by Wanda Wesołowska